The Battle of Friedberg, also called the Battle of Limburg, took place on 10 November 1793 between French and Prussian troops during the French Revolutionary Wars.

Battle 
While the Austrians saw themselves on the eve of losing their possessions in Belgium, the Prussian army, which had scarcely escaped from France, hastened to the aid of the Palatinate invaded by French General Adam Philippe, Comte de Custine. After having protected Koblenz by leaving a division there, Prussian field marshal Charles William Ferdinand, Duke of Brunswick-Wolfenbüttel settled in and around Limburg, where he considered himself well-situated to block French progress. On 8 November Custine ordered Colonel Jean Nicolas Houchard to assemble all his detachments and to attack the Prussians in Limburg. Louis Dominique Munnier was to support the attack with his corps.

Houchard surprised the Prussians, who, believing themselves safe in Limburg, had established negligible defenses. The French quietly installed their batteries before the enemy even thought of defending themselves. Nevertheless, after some hesitation, the Prussians brought out their troops, who threw themselves into battle, sowing some confusion. French artillery fire forced them to retreat. The French expelled the Prussians from the city; they retreated to Montabaur, while the French fortified their positions. The entire battle took 90 minutes.

Notes, citations and sources

Notes

Citations

Sources cited 

Battles of the War of the First Coalition
Battles of the French Revolutionary Wars
Battles involving Prussia
Battles involving France
Conflicts in 1793
1793 in the Holy Roman Empire
Battles in Hesse